Adrienne Ames (born Ruth Adrienne McClure; August 3, 1907 – May 31, 1947) was an American film actress. Early in her career she was known as Adrienne Truex.

Early years
Ames was born in Fort Worth, Texas, one of six children of Samuel Hugh McClure and Flora Parthenia (née Potter) McClure.

Career

Film

Ames began her film career in 1927 as a stand-in for Pola Negri. Ames was soon cast in small film roles in silent films. With the advent of talking pictures, Ames' popularity grew and she was usually cast as society women, or in musicals. She made thirty films during the 1930s with her biggest success in George White's Scandals (1934). She appeared with the three leading men from the 1931 version of Dracula (Bela Lugosi, David Manners, and Edward Van Sloan) in The Death Kiss (1932).

Radio
Ames left Hollywood for New York. In 1941, she was host of two talk shows on station WHN in New York City. Her schedule included broadcasts at noon and 3:30 p.m. six days a week and 7:30 p.m. broadcasts on Tuesdays, Thursdays, and Saturdays. She continued broadcasting until two weeks before her death in 1947.

Television
In December 1941, Ames began a weekly series of movie-review programs on WNBT in New York City. The 10-minute programs ran on Tuesday afternoons.

Personal life
Ames was married three times. In 1920, while still a teenager, she married Derward Dumont Truax, the son of an oil businessman. They had a daughter, and divorced in 1924. A later marriage to broker Stephen Ames ended in divorce on October 30, 1933. Her last marriage, on October 31, 1933, was to fellow actor Bruce Cabot; they divorced on July 24, 1935.

Death
Ames died of cancer on May 31, 1947, in New York City, aged 39. She is interred in the Oakwood Cemetery in her hometown of Fort Worth, Texas.

For her contributions to the film industry, Ames has a motion pictures star on the Hollywood Walk of Fame at 1612 Vine Street. It was dedicated February 8, 1960.

Filmography

References

External links

The Private Life and Times of Adrienne Ames
Adrienne Ames at Virtual History

1907 births
1947 deaths
20th-century American actresses
American film actresses
American silent film actresses
Deaths from cancer in New York (state)
Actresses from Fort Worth, Texas
American radio personalities